Nyangatom may refer to:

 Nyangatom people, of Ethiopia and South Sudan
 Nyangatom language
 Nyangatom (woreda), a district in the Southern Nations, Nationalities, and Peoples' Region, Ethiopia